A kanban board is one of the tools that can be used to implement kanban to manage work at a personal or organizational level.

Kanban boards visually depict work at various stages of a process using cards to represent work items and columns to represent each stage of the process.  Cards are moved from left to right to show progress and to help coordinate teams performing the work.  A kanban board may be divided into horizontal "swimlanes" representing different kinds of work or different teams performing the work.

Kanban boards can be used in knowledge work or for manufacturing processes.

Simple boards have columns for "waiting", "in progress", and "completed" or "to-do", "doing", and "done". Complex kanban boards can be created that subdivide "in progress" work into multiple columns to visualise the flow of work across a whole value stream map.

Applications

Kanban can be used to organize many areas of an organization and can be designed accordingly. The simplest kanban board consists of three columns: "to-do", "doing" and "done", though some additional detail such as WiP limits are needed to fully support the Kanban Method. Business functions that use kanban boards include:

 Kanban board for software development team. A popular example of a kanban board for agile or lean software development consists of: Backlog, Ready, Coding, Testing, Approval, and Done columns. It is also a common practice to name columns in a different way, for example: Next, In Development, Done, Customer Acceptance, Live.
 Kanban for marketing teams
 Kanban for HR teams
 Personal task management or "personal kanban"
Kanban for accounting teams. Usually consists of columns: new items, ready for distribution, in progress, and completed.

Notable tools

 Asana, with boards
 Azure DevOps Server, an integrated ALM-platform for managing work in and across multiple teams.
 CA Technologies Rally, provides teams with the option of managing pull-based, lean software development projects.
 Evernote.
 Jira, provides kanban boards.
 Kanboard, open source kanban-based project management software
 Microsoft Planner, a planning application available on the Microsoft Office 365 platform.
 Monday.com, a cloud-based platform that allows users to create their own applications and work management software.
 Notion, a project management and database application includes kanban board views.
 Odoo, an open-source ERP and CRM, provides kanban boards for most apps.
 OpenProject, a web-based open source project management system with the ability to create action boards to implement Kanban boards.
 Pivotal Tracker provides kanban boards
 Projektron BCS, project management tool, provides kanban boards for tickets and tasks
 ServiceNow platform, offers kanban style visual task boards.
 Trello, cards-based project management.
 Tuleap, agile open source tool for development teams: customize board columns, set WIP (Work In Progress), connect board with Issue Trackers, Git, Documents 
 Twproject (formerly Teamwork), project and groupware management tool.
 Unicom Focal Point, a portfolio management and product management tool.
 Wrike, An agile collaborative work management
 Workflowy, A web-based outliner

See also 
 Kanban (development)
 Scrum
 Continuous-flow manufacturing
 Getting Things Done
 Project management
 Task management
 Visual control

References 

Japanese business terms
Lean manufacturing
Project management techniques
Project management